The 4th Kazakhstan President Cup was played from April 26 to April 30, 2011 in Astana. 8 youth teams participated in the tournament (players were born no earlier than 1995.)

Participants

Venues 
All games took place in  «Astana Arena».

Format 
The tournament is held in two stages. At the first stage, eight teams are divided into two qualification groups (A and B). Competitions of the first stage were held on circular system. The winners of the groups advance to the final, while the group runners-up meet to determine third place.

Group stage
All times UTC+6

Group A

Group B

Match for the 7th place

Match for the 5th place

Bronze medal match

Final

Statistics

Goalscorers 

4 goals

  Ruslan Nasirli

3 goals

  Vardan Bakalyan

2 goals

  Orkhan Aliyev
  Gurbanali Aliyev
  Chiaber Chechelashvili
  Nikoloz Akhvlediani
  Davit Makaradze
  Muhammad Yasini
  Abat Ayimbetov
  Boris Donchenko
  Taylan Antalyali
  Hüsemittin Yener
  Atabey Çiçek

1 goal

  Sargs Shagnyan
  Aramais Keosayan
  Gamlet Asoyan
  Edgar Haratyunyan
  Roman Chanturia
  Aleko Mjevashvili
  Giorgi Aburjania
  Reza Qarmullaçab
  Bazzadi
  Karamollahabi
  Anuar Zhagyppar
  Rafael Aliyev
  Vladimir Vomenko
  Hasan Karakas
  Serhat Çakmak
  Dmytro Bilonoh
  Yuri Yastrub
  Mykyta Vetrov
  Izatulla Abdullaev
  Oybek Erkinov

Awards 
The best player of a tournament
 Nikoloz Akhvlediani
Goalscorer of a tournament
 Ruslan Nasirli (4 goals)
The best goalkeeper of a tournament
 Dmitri Golubnichii
The best defender of a tournament
 Ihor Kharatin 
The best midfielder of a tournament
 Serhat Çakmak
The best forward of a tournament
 Dmytro Kryvonoh

Prize money 
According to FFK, the prize fund of a tournament will make 20,000 $. "The teams which took 1, 2 and 3 place will be received, respectively 10,000, 6,000 and 4,000 $.

References 

2011
2011 in Kazakhstani football
2010–11 in European football
2011 in Asian football
2011 in youth association football